OWW  may refer to:

 Oxford, Worcester and Wolverhampton Railway, a railway company operating between 1852 and 1860
 Old Westminsters, people who were educated at Westminster School

See also
Ow (disambiguation)